The Hobie Dragoon was designed by Hobie Cat Europe as a youth trainer for boat racing. The target age is 12 to 14 years.  The Dragoon has  a twin trapeze and spinnaker option. The class has International Sailing Federation Class status.

Events

World Championships

References

External links
 Builders Website
 ISAF Microsite

Catamarans
Classes of World Sailing
Sailboat type designs by Hobie Cat Europe
Sailboat types built by Hobie Cat Europe